Marisa Gerez (born 3 November 1976) is an Argentine football defender who played for the Argentina women's national football team. She participated at the 2008 Summer Olympics.  
At the club level, she played for Boca Juniors.

See also
 Argentina at the 2008 Summer Olympics

References

External links
 
 

1976 births
Living people
Place of birth missing (living people)
Argentine women's footballers
Women's association football defenders
Argentina women's international footballers
2003 FIFA Women's World Cup players
Footballers at the 2007 Pan American Games
Pan American Games competitors for Argentina
Footballers at the 2008 Summer Olympics
Olympic footballers of Argentina